Albert Manifold  is an Irish businessman, who has been the chief executive officer (CEO) of CRH plc, a FTSE 100 building materials group, since January 2014, succeeding Myles Lee. Manifold had been chief operating officer and a board member of CRH since January 2009.

References

1962 births
Irish chief executives
Living people
Place of birth missing (living people)
Chief operating officers